S Glacier is in North Cascades National Park in the U.S. state of Washington, on the east slopes of Hurry-up Peak. S Glacier is disconnected in several spots. The uppermost sections terminate in icefalls, while the lower section ends in talus.

See also
List of glaciers in the United States

References

Glaciers of the North Cascades
Glaciers of Chelan County, Washington
Glaciers of Washington (state)